The Pearl Harbor Remembrance Bridge (formerly the Gardiner-Randolph Bridge), is a steel girder and concrete bridge that crosses the Kennebec River between Gardiner and Randolph, Maine. It carries Maine State Routes 9, 126, and 27. It was built in 1980 to replace an older truss bridge several hundred yards downstream. The bridge was given its current name in 2001 to honor the 60th anniversary of the attack on Pearl Harbor.

References

Road bridges in Maine
Bridges in Kennebec County, Maine
Bridges completed in 1980
Attack on Pearl Harbor
Monuments and memorials in Maine
World War II memorials in the United States
Steel bridges in the United States
Concrete bridges in the United States
Girder bridges in the United States